Daniel of Galicia or Danylo Romanovych (Old Ruthenian: Данило Романовичъ, Danylo Romanovyčъ; ; 1201 – 1264) was a King of Ruthenia, Prince (Kniaz) of Galicia (Halych) (1205–1255), Peremyshl (1211), and Volodymyr (1212–1231). He was crowned by a papal archbishop in Dorohochyn in 1253 as the first King of Ruthenia (1253–1264).

Biography 
In 1205, after the death of his father, Roman II Mstyslavich, the ruler of Galicia–Volhynia, the boyars of Galicia forced the four-year-old Daniel into exile with his mother Anna of Byzantium and brother Vasylko Romanovich. After the boyars proclaimed one of their own as prince in 1213, the Poles and Hungarians invaded the principality, ostensibly to support the claims of young Daniel and Vasylko, and divided it between themselves. In 1219, he renounced his claims to Galicia in favor of his father-in-law Mstislav the Bold.

In 1221, Daniel re-established his rule over Volhynia, where the boyars and populace had remained loyal to his dynasty. In 1234, he defeated Alexander Vsevolodovich, taking the Duchy of Belz. By 1238, he had defeated former Dobrzyń Knights at Drohiczyn (Dorohochyn), and regained most of Galicia, including the capital Halych. While the Prussians were under pressure from the Teutonic Order, Daniel attempted to conquer related Yatvingians.

Mongol invasion
The following year, with the advancing Mongols, Michael, Grand Prince of Kyiv, who was married to Daniel's sister, ran out of Kyiv and asked Daniel for help. Daniel dispatch his voivode, Dmytro, to defend the city. However, after a long siege, its walls were breached and, despite fierce fighting within the city, Kyiv fell on 6 December 1240 and was largely destroyed. A year later, the Mongols passed through Galicia and Volhynia while campaigning against the Poles and Hungarians, destroying Galicia.

On 17 August 1245, Daniel defeated a combined force of the Prince of Chernigov, disaffected boyars, and Hungarian and Polish elements at Yaroslav and finally took the remainder of Galicia, thus reconstituting his father's holdings. He made his brother Vasylko ruler of Volhynia and retained the Galician title for himself, though he continued to exercise real powers in both places.

Daniel's domestic policies focused on stability and economic growth. During his rule, German, Polish, and Rus' merchants and artisans were invited into Galicia, and numbers of Armenians and Jews established themselves in the towns and cities. Daniel founded the towns of Lviv (1256) (naming the former for his son) and Kholm, and fortified many others. He appointed officials to protect the peasantry from aristocratic exploitation and formed peasant-based heavy infantry units.

Yet Daniel's successes and his failed defense of Kyiv attracted the further attention of the Mongols. In 1246, he was summoned to the capital of the Golden Horde at Sarai on the Volga River and was forced to accept Mongol overlordship. According to the Ukrainian historian Orest Subtelny, Daniel was handed a cup of fermented mare's milk by the Mongol khan Batu and told to get used to it, as "you are one of ours now." They exchanged hostages whereby 100 families of Keraites were re-settled in Carpathian Galicia. According to James Chambers, the following dialogue took place between Batu and Daniel of Galicia: At a banquet Batu asked if he drank kumiz like the Mongols and Daniel answered: "Until now I did not, but now I do as you command and I drink it." To which Batu replied: "You are now one of ours," and since he was more used to it ordered that Daniel be given a goblet of wine. This was due to Daniel's notorious love of wine.

While formally accepting the Mongols as overlords, and supplying them with soldiers as required, Daniel built a foreign policy around opposition to the Golden Horde. He established cordial relations with the rulers of the Kingdom of Poland and Kingdom of Hungary, and requested aid from Pope Innocent IV in the form of a crusade. In return for papal assistance, Daniel offered to place his lands under the ecclesiastical authority of Rome, a pledge never realised. Wooed by the prospect of extending his authority, the Pope encouraged Daniel's resistance to the Mongols and his Western orientation, and in 1253, had a papal representative crown Daniel at Dorohochyn on the Bug River. Danylo wanted more than recognition, however, and commented bitterly that he expected an army when he received the crown. The following year, Daniel repelled Mongol assaults led by Orda's son, Kuremsa, on Ponyzia and Volhynia and dispatched an expedition with the aim of taking Kyiv. Despite initial successes, in 1259, a Mongol force under Burundai and Nogai Khan entered Galicia and Volhynia and offered an ultimatum: Daniel was to destroy his fortifications or Burundai would assault the towns. Daniel complied and pulled down the city walls.

In the last years of his reign, Daniel engaged in dynastic politics, marrying a son and a daughter to the offspring of Mindaugas of the Grand Duchy of Lithuania and acquiring territorial concessions in Poland from the latter. Another daughter of his, Ustynia, was married to Prince Andrey Yaroslavich of Vladimir-Suzdal. He also arranged for the marriage of his son Roman to Gertrude, the Babenberg heiress, but was unsuccessful in his bid to have him placed on the ducal throne of Austria.

By his death in 1264, Daniel had reconstructed and expanded the territories held by his father, held off the expansionist threats of Poland and Hungary, minimized Mongol influence on Western Ukraine, and raised the economic and social standards of his domains. He was succeeded in Galicia by his son Lev.

Honours 
A monument to him was erected in 1998 in Halych.

On 7 September 2011 the parliament of Ukraine (Verkhovna Rada) issued a resolution on "celebration of the 810th Anniversary of the birth of the first King of Ruthenia-Ukraine Daniel of Galicia".

Family 

Wives
 Anna of Novgorod († bef. 1252), 1218, daughter of Mstislav the Bold
 NN, niece of King Mindaugas of Lithuania, bef. 1252

Sisters
 Feodora of Galicia († after 1200), m. 1187 (div 1188) Vasilko of Galicia
 Maria of Galicia († after 1241), m. before 1200 Michael of Chernigov, sometime Grand Prince of Kiev and ultimately a saint.

Sons
 Irakli Danylovich (*ca. 1223 – † by 1240)
 Lev I of Galicia (*ca. 1228 – † ca. 1301), Prince of Belz 1245–1264, Prince of Peremyshl 1264–1269, Prince of Halych 1269–1301, Prince of Halych-Volynia 1293–1301 ; he moved his capital from Halych to the newly founded city of Lviv (Lwów, Lemberg), m. 1257 Constance, daughter of Béla IV of Hungary.
 Roman Danylovych (*ca. 1230 – † ca. 1261), Prince of Black Ruthenia (Navahradak) 1255? – 1260?, and Slonim
 Mstyslav Danylovych († aft. 1300), Prince of Lutsk 1265–1289, Prince of Volynia 1289 – aft. 1300
 Svarn (Shvarno, Švarnas, Ioann; † 1269, bur. Chełm), Grand Duke of Lithuania 1264–1267 (1268–1269?), Prince of Chełm 1264–1269

Daughters
 Pereyaslava († 12 April 1283), m. ca. 1248 Prince Siemowit I of Masovia
 Ustynia, m. 1250/1251 Prince Andrew II of Vladimir-Suzdal
 Sofia Danielvna, m. 1259 Graf Heinrich V von Schwarzburg-Blankenburg: they were the parents of Utta von Schwarzburg-Blankenburg, who was the eponymous ancestor of the House of Reuss

Ancestry

See also 
 List of Ukrainian rulers
 List of rulers of Galicia and Volhynia
 Crown of Rus

References

Bibliography

External links 

1201 births
1264 deaths
Kings of Rus'
13th-century princes in Kievan Rus'
Romanovichi family
Eastern Orthodox monarchs
People from Halych
Angelid dynasty
City founders